Vaughan Hanning Vaughan-Lee (25 February 1836 – 7 July 1882) was an English Conservative Party politician who sat in the House of Commons from 1874 to 1882.

Vaughan-Lee was born Lee, the son of John Lee Lee of Dillington House, Ilminster and his first wife Jessy Edwards-Vaughan, daughter of John Edwards-Vaughan of Rheola. His father and maternal grandfather were MPs for Wells at the same time. (Vaughan-) Lee was educated at Eton College and joined the Royal Scots Fusiliers (21st) in 1854.

He took part in the Crimean War in 1854 to 1855 including the Battle of Alma, the Battle of Inkerman, the Siege of Sevastopol and the attack on the redan and Kinbourn. He was promoted to lieutenant in December 1854 and was wounded twice. In 1858, he became a captain and in 1859  retired from the army. He was a major in the Glamorganshire Light Infantry Militia, and a captain in the West Somerset Yeomanry Cavalry.

He was a J.P. and Deputy Lieutenant for Glamorgan and Somerset and was High Sheriff of Glamorgan in 1871. In 1874 he assumed the additional surname Vaughan.

At the 1874 general election Vaughan-Lee was elected Member of Parliament (MP) for West Somerset. He held the seat until he resigned shortly before his death at the age of 46 in 1882.

Vaughan-Lee married Clara Elizabeth Moore, daughter of George Moore of Appleby Hall, Leicestershire in 1861.

References

External links

1836 births
1882 deaths
People educated at Eton College
UK MPs 1880–1885
UK MPs 1874–1880
Deputy Lieutenants of Glamorgan
Deputy Lieutenants of Somerset
High Sheriffs of Glamorgan
Members of the Parliament of the United Kingdom for English constituencies